A purported Khazar ruler of the late tenth century CE who ruled over a Khazar successor-state in the Taman region. David is mentioned in a single document dated AM 4746 (985/986 CE) which contains a reference to "our lord David, Prince of the Khazars, who lives in Taman." The document in question is of uncertain authenticity, as it passed through the hands of Abraham Firkovich, who on occasion forged documents and inscriptions.

Based upon this text, Heinrich Graetz hypothesized that the Khazars reorganized themselves after 969 in Crimea and the Taman peninsula. Graetz further maintained that the Khazar Jewish representatives summoned by Vladimir I of Kiev to debate the merits of their religion against representatives from Catholic Germany, Orthodox Byzantium, and Muslim Volga Bulgaria were dispatched by David and were citizens of his Pontic kingdom.

David's capital may have been in or near Tmutorakan; though rule by the Kievan Rus is reported in Russian sources before 985, it is conceivable that the Khazars reasserted control over the town or that David ruled as a client. The first independent Russian prince of Tmutorakan is Mstislav, whose rule began in 988. The later Khazar ruler Georgius Tzul ruled from Kerch; it is uncertain whether his kingdom was the same polity that had earlier been under the rule of David of Taman.

Resources
Kevin Alan Brook. The Jews of Khazaria. 2nd ed. Rowman & Littlefield Publishers, Inc, 2006.
Douglas M. Dunlop, The History of the Jewish Khazars, Princeton, N.J.: Princeton University Press, 1954.

Turkic rulers
Khazar rulers
Jewish royalty
10th-century rulers in Europe